Gohar Kheirandish (born ) is an Iranian actress and was born in Neyriz. While studying and working in Tehran, Kheirandish started working in television. Her first film, Days of Waiting, was directed by Asghar Hashemi. She then appeared in Lady, directed by Dariush Mehrjoyi.

Filmography
1987 Days of Waiting
1988 The Branches of Willow
1989 Zir-e bamha-ye shahr
1989 The Grand Day
1989 Shab-e hadese
1991 Madreseye piremardha
1991 The Shadow of Imagination
1994 Boo-ye khosh-e zendegi
1994 A Man, a Bear
1995 Chehre
1997 Saghar
1999 Baanoo
1999 Sheida
2000 The Mix
2001 Morabbaye shirin
2002 Low Heights
2002 Nan va eshgh va motor 1000
2002 Thirteen Cats on the Gabled Roof
2003 The Fifth Reaction
2003 Donya
2004 Tradition of Lover Killing
2005 Maxx
2006 Bi Vafa
2007 Ghaedeye bazi
2007 The Forbidden Fruit (TV Series)
2007 The Trial
2008 Tambourine
2008 Shirin
2008 Invitation
2009 Heartbroken
2010 Setayesh Part 1 (TV Series)
2010 Mokhtarnameh (TV Series)
2010 Dar Rah Vila (Video short)
2011 Along City
2011 Smiling in the Rain
2011 Okhtapus
2012 Octopus1: White forehead
2012 Migren
2012 Growing in the Wind
2013 Tehran 1500
2014 Azar, Shahdokht Parviz and Others
2014 Negar's Role
2014 Crazy
2018 Pastarioni
2019 The Good, The Bad, The Corny 2: Secret Army 
2020 The Badger

Theatre
Khaak: Soil 1970
Mozerat Dokhaniyat: Negative effects of Carcinogens 1970
Afsaneh Vafa: Vafa's Legend 1972
Shahr Bidar: Woken City 1972
Nabegeyi az dodeman ariarmaneh:  A genius from Ariarmaneh Clan 1973
Mar dar Austin:  Snake in Sleeve 1973
Rostam Va Sohrab: Rostam & Sohrab 1973
Pahlevan Kachal: The Bald Paladin 1974
Az No: From the top 1975
Mostajer: The tenant 1976
Adab Mard Beh Ze Dolat sot:  One's manners Matter more than one's wealth 1979
Ghahveh Khaneyi dar Akhar Zaman: A coffee Shop at the end of the Time 1977
Bolbol Sargashteh: Perplexed Nightingale 1979
Vazir Khan Lankaran: Minister Khan Lankaran 1979
Cheshm dar barber Cheshm: An eye for an eye 1972
Khers neveshteh: Written Bear 1980
Khastegari: Marriage Proposal 1980
Parvaneh Mofaregi: The Carefree Butterfly 1980
Gorg: Wolf 1979
Dikteh va Zaviye: Spelling and Angles  1977
Shoyok dar Jang Jahani Dovom: Shoyok in World War II 1981
Anjelica:  Anjelica 1979
Herrati va Koryani; Herrati & Koryani 1982
Hemaseh Naneh Khazireh: The Epic of Nana Khazireh 1980
Teragedy kasra: Kasra's Tragedy 1982
Garneshinan: Cave people 1986
Mostajer Jadid: New Tenant 1988
Tokayi dar Gafas:  Tokayi In cage 1972
Mahi Siyah Kocholo: little Black Fish 1971
Khorshid Khanom: Mrs. Sun 1971
hasanak Kojayi? : Where are you Hasanak? 1971
Gol mad bahar Amad: Flowers Bloomed and Spring Came with it 1970
Mehmanhaye nakhandeh: Unexpected Guests 1970
Bloog: Puberty 1979
Torandokht: Torandokht 1996
Gozaresh Mahramaneh Octavia: Octavia's Secret Brief 1970
Charkheh Atash: The Cycle of Fire 1999
Roozi Rooz Gari Abadan: One upon a time in Abadan... 1999

Television
Aaeenihe 1985
Modarres: Modarres 1986
een Sharh Binahayat: This Endless Explanation 1987
Roozi Roozgari: Once upon a Time 1992
Roozegar Vasl: The days of Togetherness 1992
Hobaba: Bubble 1994
Zir Gonbad Kabod: Under the red Sky 1995
Do Panjereh: Two Windows 1995
Bibi Yon: Bibi Yon/nana yon 1995
Ashpaz bash: the Head Chef 1995
Siyah, Sefid, Khakestari: Black, White, Grey 1997
Majarahaye Khanevadeh tamadon:  The Adventures of Tamadon Family 1998
Hamsayeha: Neighbours 2000
Khaneh Ma: Our Home 2000
Safar Sabz: Green journey 2002
Jazireye Jado: The Magical Island 2003
Miveh Mamnohe: Forbidden Fruit 2007
Ashkha va Labkhandha: Tears and Smiles 2007
Mokhtarnameh 2010-2011
Hamchon Sarve: Cypress alike 2010
Bacheha Negah Mikonand: Children watching 2009
Naz va Niyaz: Pray and worship 2011
Alafzar: Meadow 2012
Dokhtaran Hava: Eve's Daughters 2012
Kolah Pahlavi: Pahlavi Hat 2012-2013
Madar: Mother 2013
Ma Fereshteh Nistim (We are not angels) 2014
The Monster (2019)

Awards
Winner of Crystal Simorgh at 22rd Fajr Film Festival for Best Actress for 'Love Killing Tradition'
Winner of special Diploma from 20th Fajr Film Festival for 'Low Altitude'
Winner of Golden Trophy from 12th Iranian Cinema House Awards for 'Invitation'
Winner of Golden Trophy from 7th Iranian Cinema House Awards for 'Fifth Reaction'
Winner of Golden Trophy from 7th Iranian Cinema House Awards 'World'
Winner of Award for Best Actress in Supporting role at Writers & Critics guild award for 'Low Altitude'
Nominated for Crystal Simorgh at 21st Fajr Film Festival For Supporting Actress In 'Fifth Reaction'
Nominated for Crystal Simorgh at 17th Fajr Film Festival For Supporting Actress In 'Winning Warrior'
Nominated for Crystal Simorgh at 14th Fajr Film Festival For Supporting Actress In 'Face'
Nominated for Crystal Simorgh at 8th  Fajr Film Festival For Supporting Actress In 'Underneath City's Roofs'
Nominated for Golden Trophy at 6th Iranian Cinema House Awards for 'Low Altitude'
Nominated at The Farhang Foundation

References

External links

1954 births
Living people
People from Shiraz
People from Tehran
Iranian film actresses
Iranian stage actresses
Iranian voice actresses
People from Fars Province
University of Tehran alumni
Iranian television actresses
20th-century Iranian actresses
Crystal Simorgh for Best Actress winners